Isah Aliyu (born 8 August 1999) is a Nigerian footballer who plays as a attacking midfielder.

Club career
Born in Kaduna, Aliyu joined Remo Stars in 2016, from Kakuri Academy. He was an important unit of the club who achieved promotion from the Nigeria National League in that year, and also appeared in the 2017 Nigeria Professional Football League, suffering relegation.

On 3 March 2018, Aliyu moved abroad and joined Armenian side Lori FC. He contributed with three goals in his first season, as his side achieved promotion to the Armenian Premier League as champions, and scored a further seven times in his second season, as his side finished fifth; in that season, the club also reached the final of the Armenian Cup.

On 1 September 2019, Aliyu joined Segunda División side Almeria on a five-year deal, for a fee of €140,000; Lori also retained a 20% of a future sale. He was initially assigned to the B-team in Tercera División.

On 21 January 2020, Al-Shoulla signed Aliyu for six months.

On 22 November 2020, FC Urartu announced the signing of Aliyu. After 16 appearances and one goal, Aliyu left Urartu on 10 June 2021.

On 22 July 2021, Aliyu signed for Ararat Yerevan. On 9 January 2023, Aliyu left Ararat Yerevan after his contract was terminated by mutual agreement.

Career statistics

Club

Honours
Lori
Armenian First League: 2017–18

References

External links

1999 births
Living people
Sportspeople from Kaduna
Nigerian footballers
Association football midfielders
Association football wingers
Nigeria Professional Football League players
Remo Stars F.C. players
Armenian Premier League players
Saudi First Division League players
FC Lori players
UD Almería B players
Al-Shoulla FC players
Nigerian expatriate footballers
Nigerian expatriate sportspeople in Armenia
Nigerian expatriate sportspeople in Spain
Nigerian expatriate sportspeople in Saudi Arabia
Expatriate footballers in Armenia
Expatriate footballers in Spain
Expatriate footballers in Saudi Arabia